AKP may refer to:

Companies
 Arbaaz Khan Productions, an Indian motion picture production and distribution company, based in Mumbai

Political parties
 Adalet ve Kalkınma Partisi (Justice and Development Party), a Turkish Islamist political party
 Ang Kapatiran, a Philippine political party

Communist parties
 Arbeidernes Kommunistparti (Workers' Communist Party (Norway)), a Norwegian political party
 Azərbaycan Kommunist Partiyası (Azerbaijan Communist Party), one of two Azerbaijan political parties:
Azerbaijan Communist Party, the Azerbaijan branch of the Communist Party of the Soviet Union
Azerbaijan Communist Party (1993), a minor political party in the post-Soviet Republic of Azerbaijan

Other
 AKP, IATA code for Anaktuvuk Pass Airport in Anaktuvuk Pass, Alaska
 Alpha Kappa Psi, a fraternal society for people studying for or engaged in business activities
 Agence Kampuchea Press, the national press agency of Cambodia
 Ansar Khalifa Philippines, an Islamic militant group in the Philippines